Wendy Hills (born 1 August 1954 in Merredin, Western Australia) is an Australian former cricket player. Hills played nine tests and four one day internationals for the Australia national women's cricket team.

Hills was a member of the Australian team that won the 1978 Women's Cricket World Cup.

References

External links
 Wendy Hills at CricketArchive
 Wendy Hills at southernstars.org.au

Living people
1954 births
Australia women Test cricketers
Australia women One Day International cricketers
People from Merredin, Western Australia
Western Australia women cricketers